PASS (formerly known as the Professional Association for SQL Server) was a global community for data professionals who use the Microsoft data platform. An independent, non-profit, user-run association, PASS was founded in 1999 with funds from Microsoft and Computer Associates. PASS was governed by a Board of Directors, elected by PASS members for two-year terms.

With growing membership of more than 300,000, PASS had more than 270 PASS Local Groups around the world as well as over 20 PASS Virtual Groups focused on a specific topic or providing learning opportunities in different local languages. Every fall, the organization hosted PASS Summit, the largest conference in the world for data professionals using the Microsoft data platform. From 2013 to 2015 PASS hosted the PASS Business Analytics Conference for data and business analysts, data scientists, and BI professionals. PASS offered virtual and in-person training for professionals working with the Microsoft Data Platform; covering topics across Architecture, Data Management, and Analytics. PASS hosted events include SQLSaturday, PASS Marathon, 24 Hours of PASS (24HOP), and the global PASS Summit conference. PASS also offered regional in-person training and networking through PASS Local Groups.  

On December 17, 2020 PASS announced that because of COVID-19, they were ceasing all operations effective January 15, 2021.

On January 28, 2021 Redgate Software announced it had acquired the assets of PASS.

PASS Summit locations
 1999 - Chicago
 2000 - San Francisco
 2001 - scheduled for Orlando Sept 15, 2001 - Canceled
 2002 - Denver (January)
 2002 - Seattle (November)
 2003 - Seattle
 2004 - Orlando
 2005 - Dallas
 2006 - Seattle
 2007 - Denver
 2008 - Seattle
 2009 - Seattle
 2010 - Seattle
 2011 - Seattle
 2012 - Seattle
 2013 - Charlotte
 2014 - Seattle
 2015 - Seattle
 2016 - Seattle, WA on October 25–28
 2017 - Seattle, WA on October 31-November 3
 2018 - Seattle, WA on November 6-9
 2019 - Seattle, WA on November 5-8
 2022 - Seattle, WA on November 15-18

PASS Business Analytics Conference
 2013 - Chicago
 2014 - San Jose, CA
 2015 - Santa Clara, CA
 2016 - San Jose, CA

European Conference locations
 2000 - London
 2005 - Munich
 2006 - Barcelona
 2008 - Neuss, Germany
 2009 - Neuss, Germany
 2010 - Neuss, Germany

References

External links

SQLSaturday official website

Microsoft database software